Toridaga-Ko is a rural commune in the Cercle of Niono in the Ségou Region of Mali. The commune covers an area of approximately 653 square kilometers and includes 18 villages. In the 2009 census the population was 26,901.  The administrative center (chef-lieu) is the village of Bolibana which lies 20 km north of Niono.

References

External links
.
.

Communes of Ségou Region